The South Czech Philharmonic (formerly known as South Bohemian Chamber Philharmonic or Chamber Philharmonic Orchestra of South Bohemia), based in České Budějovice, was founded in 1981; its original name was The South Bohemian State Orchestra.  At present, it consists of 37 artists and remains the only professional philharmonic orchestra in the region of South Bohemia.

Origins of the orchestra are associated with a Czech conductor Jaroslav Vodňanský; subsequently, the position of Chief Conductor was held by Ondřej Kukal, Břetislav Novotný, Jaroslav Křeček and Stanislav Vavřínek.  The current Chief Conductor, Jan Talich, has been leading the orchestra since 2008.

Besides interpreting the music of classical composers and pieces appropriate for chambre orchestras and smaller concert halls, the Philharmonic is dedicating increasing attention to the contemporary trend of interlinking genres and discovering new perspectives of both interpretation and  presentation of music.

References 
 South Czech Philharmonic page on The Association of Symphony Orchestras and Choirs of the Czech Republic website
 Reference to the South Czech Philharmonic on the Lonely Planet site

External links 
 
 Open-air concert of South Czech Philharmonic in Lipno 
 The South Bohemian Chamber Philharmonic Discography
 List of South Czech Philharmonic orchestra concerts during the Year of Czech Music 2014

Czech orchestras
Musical groups established in 1981
České Budějovice